Eugene Loring McAllaster was born April 20, 1866 in Pennsylvania. A distinguished Seattle, Washington, naval architect and engineer, he is most famous for designing the historic Seattle fireboat Duwamish. He was also a consulting engineer on Seattle's Denny Hill and Jackson Street regrades.

Mr. McAllaster graduated from the University of Michigan in 1889 and in 1890 he married Katherine F. Nichols. Kittie, as she was known by friends and family, was born in Michigan, on June 16, 1867, and spent her girlhood in Ann Arbor, Michigan.

The newlyweds lived in Detroit until their move to Seattle in 1894. Mr. McAllaster quickly established himself in the Seattle business community as a skilled naval architect and engineer. He became deeply involved with the Denny Hill Regrade and Jackson Street Regrade, and was an integral part of the successes of these massive undertakings.

With his business prospering he purchased a fine Capitol Hill home on March 2, 1902, at 509 Belmont, overlooking downtown Seattle, Puget Sound and the Olympic Mountains.

Seattle in the early 1900s, with its long waterfront of wooden docks, warehouses and merchant vessels, was an enormous responsibility for Seattle's fire department. It was rightfully feared that another devastating fire like the Great Seattle Fire of 1889 would overwhelm the capability of the city's single fireboat, the Snoqualmie.

In response to this concern, a new and more powerful fireboat was ordered in 1909. The city entrusted the important fireboat design responsibility to Mr. McAllaster.

It wasn't in Mr. McAllaster's character to design just some old tub with water cannons. He had arrived in Seattle only five years after the Great Seattle Fire and he knew what kind of catastrophe another big city fire would cause. He set out to design a state of the art fireboat like no other. What he designed was the most powerful fireboat in the world at the time, the fireboat Duwamish.

Mr. McAllaster died on January 30, 1961, and is buried next to his wife in Seattle's Lake View Cemetery, along with other Seattle notables.

References
The Charles A. Rough Archive, 2006

External links
Biography of Eugene L. McAllaster
Seattle's Historic Fireboat Duwamish

1866 births
1946 deaths
American naval architects
Engineers from Washington (state)
People from Seattle
University of Michigan alumni